This is a list of films which have placed number one at the weekend box office in the United States during 1982.

Number-one films
{| class="wikitable sortable"
! 
! Week ending
! Film
! Gross
! Notes
! class="unsortable"| 
|-
| 1 ||  || Modern Problems || $5,432,125||  || 
|-
| 2 ||  || Sharky's Machine || $2,850,839|| Sharky's Machine reached #1 in its fourth weekend of release. || 
|-
| 3 ||  || Absence of Malice || $3,290,111 || Absence of Malice reached #1 in its ninth weekend of release || 
|-
| 4 ||  || rowspan="7" | On Golden Pond || $3,853,902 || On Golden Pond reached #1 in its eighth weekend of release. || 
|-
| 5 ||  || $5,008,290 ||  || 
|-
| 6 ||  || $4,900,463 ||  || 
|-
| 7 || 4-day weekend || $8,177,208 ||  || 
|-
| 8 ||  || $6,526,822 ||  || 
|-
| 9 ||  || $5,602,328 ||  || 
|-
| 10 ||  || $5,507,123  ||  || 
|-
| 11 ||  || Richard Pryor: Live on the Sunset Strip || $7,780,693 ||  || 
|-
| 12 ||  || rowspan="8" | Porky's || $7,623,988 ||  || 
|-
| 13 ||  || $8,602,473 ||  || 
|-
| 14 ||  || $8,034,766 ||  || 
|-
| 15 ||  || $8,082,295 ||  || 
|-
| 16 ||  || $6,511,216 ||  || 
|-
| 17 ||  || $5,280,637 ||  || 
|-
| 18 ||  || $4,333,570 ||  || 
|-
| 19 ||  || $3,393,114 ||  || 
|-
| 20 ||  || rowspan="2" | Conan the Barbarian || $9,603,139 || Conan the Barbarian broke Halloween IIs record ($7.67 million) for highest weekend debut for a R-rated film. || 
|-
| 21 ||  || $6,874,042 ||  || 
|-
| 22 || 4-day weekend || Rocky III || $16,015,408 || Rocky IIIs 4-day Memorial Day weekend was the highest weekend of all-time surpassing the $14.1 million earned by Superman II in 1981. || 
|-
| 23 ||  || Star Trek II: The Wrath of Khan || $14,347,221 || Star Trek II: The Wrath of Khan had the highest 3-day weekend debut of all-time surpassing Superman II'''s $14.1 million. || 
|-
| 24 ||  || rowspan="6" | E.T. the Extra-Terrestrial || $11,835,389 ||  || 
|-
| 25 ||  || $12,610,610 || Highest-grossing second weekend of all-time surpassing the record of $10,765,687 set last year by Superman II. || 
|-
| 26 ||  || $13,729,552 ||  || 
|-
| 27 || 4-day weekend || $16,706,592 || Highest-grossing weekend of all-time surpassing the record set earlier in the year by Rocky III. E.T. becomes the first film to have four weekends with a gross over $10 million, surpassing the three set by Superman II the previous year.|| 
|-
| 28 ||  || $12,802,287 ||  || 
|-
| 29 ||  || $13,003,581 ||  || 
|-
| 30 ||  || The Best Little Whorehouse in Texas || $11,874,268 || The Best Little Whorehouse in Texas broke Conan the Barbarians record ($9.60 million) for highest weekend debut for a R-rated film. || 
|-
| 31 ||  || rowspan="2" | E.T. the Extra-Terrestrial || $10,425,071 || E.T. the Extra-Terrestrial reclaimed #1 in its eighth weekend of release.  It was E.T.s eighth weekend grossing more than $10 million and the highest-grossing 8th weekend of all time. || 
|-
| 32 ||  || $9,525,306 ||  || 
|-
| 33 ||  || Friday the 13th Part III || $9,406,522 || Friday the 13th Part III broke Halloween IIs record ($7.67 million) for highest weekend debut for a slasher film. || 
|-
| 34 ||  || rowspan="2" | E.T. the Extra-Terrestrial || $7,684,162 || E.T. the Extra-Terrestrial reclaimed #1 in its eleventh weekend of release. || 
|-
| 35 ||  || $6,630,709 ||  || 
|-
| 36 || 4-day weekend || An Officer and a Gentleman || $7,711,202 || An Officer and a Gentleman reached #1 in its sixth weekend of release. || 
|-
| 37 ||  || rowspan="2" | E.T. the Extra-Terrestrial || $4,598,728 || E.T. the Extra-Terrestrial reclaimed #1 in its fourteenth weekend of release. ||  
|-
| 38 ||  || $4,261,887 ||  || 
|-
| 39 ||  || Amityville II: The Possession || $4,104,277 ||  || 
|-
| 40 ||  || E.T. the Extra-Terrestrial || $3,742,140 || E.T. the Extra-Terrestrial reclaimed #1 in its sixteenth weekend of release. || 
|-
| 41 ||  || An Officer and a Gentleman || $4,509,267 || An Officer and a Gentleman reclaimed #1 in its eleventh weekend of release. || 
|-
| 42 ||  || E.T. the Extra-Terrestrial || $3,315,692 || E.T. the Extra-Terrestrial reclaimed #1 in its eighteenth weekend of release. || 
|-
| 43 ||  || rowspan="3" | First Blood || $6,642,005 ||  || 
|-
| 44 ||  || $4,565,972 ||  || 
|-
| 45 ||  || $4,416,115 ||  || 
|-
| 46 ||  || Creepshow || $5,870,889 ||  || 
|-
| 47 ||  || The Empire Strikes Back (1982 Re-issue) || $3,949,478 ||  || 
|-
| 48 ||  || rowspan="2" | E.T. the Extra-Terrestrial || $3,976,778 || E.T. the Extra-Terrestrial reclaimed #1 in its twenty-fourth weekend of release. || 
|-
| 49 ||  || $2,355,819 || This will be the lowest grossing #1 film until Onward grosses $71,000 during the COVID-19 pandemic. || 
|-
| 50 ||  || The Toy || $6,322,804 ||  || 
|-
| 51 ||  || rowspan="3" | Tootsie || $5,540,470 ||  || 
|-
| 52 ||  || $7,469,326 ||  || 
|-
| 53 ||  || $11,222,714 ||Columbia Pictures' biggest weekend of all-time; their first over $10 million. || 
|-
|}

Highest-grossing films

Calendar Gross
Highest-grossing films of 1982 by Calendar Gross

In-Year Release

See also
 List of American films — American films by year
 Lists of box office number-one films

Notes

References

External links
 Domestic Box Office Weekends For 1982 (Box Office Mojo)
 Theatrical Weekly Box Office Chart Calendar for 1982 (The Numbers'')

Chronology

1982
1982 in American cinema
United States